Orchard School District is an elementary public school district consisting of about 900 students in one school, located in northeast San Jose, California.  It is a school that enrolls students from kindergarten to 8th grade.

References

External links
 
 Santa Clara County Office of Education

School districts in Santa Clara County, California